The following is a list of notable people from Homs and ancient Emesa.

Ancient
see the Royal family of Emesa
Papinian (142-212), Jurist
Alexander Severus (c. 208-235), Roman emperor
Anicetus, Pope, 154-167
Cassius Longinus (c. 213-273), rhetorician and philosophical critic
Drusilla, Princess of Mauretania
Elagabalus (c. 204-222), Emperor of the Roman Empire
Fronto of Emesa (3rd century), rhetorician
Gaius Julius Alexio (d. 78), Prince and Roman Client Priest King of Emesa
Heliodorus of Emesa, Hellenistic author of Aethiopica
Iamblichus (2nd century), Syrian Greek novelist
Iamblichus (c. 31 BC), phylarch
Iotapa (b. c. 20 BC - date of death unknown), Emesani princess
Iotapa (lived in 1st century), daughter of Iotapa
Julia Urania (lived in 1st century), queen of Mauretania Province
Julia Domna (c. 160-217), Roman empress
Julia Mamaea (1st century), princess
Julia Maesa (before 160-c. 224), patron god of Emesa
Julia Avita Mamaea (after 180-235), daughter of Julia Maesa
Julia Soaemias (180-222), noblewoman
Julius Agrippa (2nd century), nobleman
Julius Alexander (d. c. 190), prince
Julius Bassianus (d. 217), high priest of sun temple
Publius Septimius Geta (189-211), Roman co-emperor
Saint Elian , Christian saint
Severus Alexander (c. 208 - 235), Roman Emperor
Sohaemus of Armenia (2nd century), Emesene Prince and Aristocrat
Sohaemus of Emesa (d. 73), Roman client king of Emesa
Tiberius Julius Balbillus (second half of the 2nd century - first half of the 3rd century), Emesene Arab Aristocrat

Medieval
Dik al-Jinn (777-849), Arabic poet during the Abbasid Caliphate

Modern
Fawaz Akhras (b. 1946), cardiologist
Bassma Al Jandaly (b. 1977), journalist and cousin of Malek, Mona and Steve
Nasib Arida (1887-1946), poet
Asma Assad (b. 1975), wife of the Syrian president Bashar al-Assad
Hashim Atassi (1875-1960), former President of Syria
Nureddin al-Atassi (1929-1992), former President of Syria
Khaled al-Atassi (1837-1908), religious scholar and poet
Lu'ay al-Atassi (1926-2003), former President of Syria
Rouwaida Attieh (b. 1982), vocalist
Wiam Simav Bedirxan, documentary filmmaker
Malek Jandali (b. 1972), composer and pianist
Mona Jandali, aka Mona E. Simpson (b. 1957), novelist, English professor
Riad Jarjour, former General Secretary of Middle East Council of Churches
Steve Jobs (1955-2011), cousin of Malek Jandali and the former CEO of Apple Inc.
Firas Al Khatib (b. 1983), footballer
Jehad Al-Hussain (b. 1984), footballer
Abdul Baset al-Sarout (1992-2017), footballer turned rebel commander
Ali Mahmoud Othman (b. 1978), journalist
Muhammad Tulaimat (b. 1941), painter
Riyad al-Turk (b. 1930), Communist opposition leader
George Wassouf (b. 1961), pop singer
Basel Manadil (b. 1993) (also known as The Hungry Syrian Wanderer), Syrian-Filipino Vlogger.
Rami Sebei (b. 1984), a Canadian professional wrestler, otherwise known as Sami Zayn whose parents were from Homs

Families
Atassi (16th century AD-present), once a prominent political and religious Ashraf family in the city

Homs